Sabanitas is a corregimiento in Colón District, Colón Province, Panama with a population of 19,052 as of 2010. Its population as of 1990 was 13,729; its population as of 2000 was 17,073.

References

Corregimientos of Colón Province
Populated places in Colón Province